Nena de Hiroshima is the second album by Argentine band Todos Tus Muertos released in 1991. This is the only album recorded for Radio Trípoli label.

Overview 
In 1989, when Horacio Villafañe left the band with Cristian Ruiz, Felix Gutiérrez chose guitarist Julio Amin, also appears Jorge Iacobellis on drums and executive producer. The album including "Break on Through" on Spanish, which was originally written and performed by The Doors.

Todos Tus Muertos presented the album in 1992, at the Roberto Pettinato ATC show, where they performed two songs: "Se que No" and "Incomunicado". That same year, the band played as opening act to the Ramones at the Obras Sanitarias stadium.

In 2001, DBN label reissued the album, and then in 2012 by the band label TTM records.

Track listing
All songs written by Jorge Serrano, except where noted.

Track listing LP
"Incomunicado"  - 1:58
"Abre la Celda" (Gutiérrez, Nadal, Villafañe) - 3:00
"Se que No" (Gutiérrez, Nadal, Villafañe) - 3:58
"Terror Al Cambio" - 3:03
"Fallas" (Gutiérrez, Nadal) - 3:48
"El Ritmo de la Sangre" - 5:06
"El Espejo" - 4:17
"Break On Through" (Jim Morrison, Robby Krieger, Ray Manzarek, John Densmore) - 2:15
"El Chupadero" (Gutiérrez, Nadal, Villafañe) - 3:02

Track listing CD re-issue
"Incomunicado"  - 1:58
"Abre la Celda" (Gutiérrez, Nadal, Villafañe) - 3:00
"Break On Through" (Jim Morrison, Robby Krieger, Ray Manzarek, John Densmore) - 2:14
"Terror Al Cambio" - 3:03
"Fallas" (Gutiérrez, Nadal) - 3:48
"El Ritmo de la Sangre" - 5:06
"Se que No" (Gutiérrez, Nadal, Villafañe) - 3:58
"El Espejo" - 4:15
"El Chupadero" (Gutiérrez, Nadal, Villafañe) - 3:02

Personnel 
Musicians
Fidel Nadal - Lead Vocals.
Julio Amin - Guitar.
Felix Gutiérrez  - Bass.
Jorge Iacobellis  - Drums.

Additional credit
Jorge Iacobellis and Julio Amin - Executive producer.
Fidel Nadal and Felix Gutiérrez - Design Cover.
Jorge Iacobellis and Amilcar Gilabert - Production.
Luis Guala - Photography.

References

1990 albums
Todos Tus Muertos albums